Brompton Oratory is a large neo-classical Roman Catholic church in the Knightsbridge area of the Royal Borough of Kensington and Chelsea, London. Its full name is the Church of the Immaculate Heart of Mary, or as named in its Grade II* architectural listing, The Oratory. The church is closely connected with the London Oratory School, a school founded by the priests from the London Oratory. Its priests celebrate Mass daily in both the Ordinary and Extraordinary forms, frequently conduct ceremonies for well-known people, as it works as an extra-parochial church. There are three choirs at the church.

Location
The church is on the A4 where it becomes Brompton Road, next to the Victoria and Albert Museum, where the street briefly becomes Thurloe Place and Cromwell Gardens but after that neighbouring museum the road becomes Cromwell Road which gradually widens via the Hammersmith Flyover into the M4.  The A308 road starts opposite the building which takes up the name Brompton Road.  It therefore marks an important junction.

History

Foundation
John Henry Newman was received into the Roman Catholic Church in 1845. He later founded the Birmingham Oratory, dedicated to Saint Philip Neri. Other former Anglicans, including Frederick William Faber, briefly established a London Oratory in premises near Charing Cross. Faber's growing following purchased a  property in November 1852 for £16,000; in the (then) rapidly developing suburb (and former village) of Brompton, later subsumed under the name of the South Kensington tube station. An Oratory House was built first, followed shortly by a temporary church; both designed by Joseph John Scoles. An appeal was then launched in 1874 for funds to build a church. Within the Oratory House is a chapel, known as the Little Oratory.

The church still belongs to, and is served by, the Congregation of the London Oratory (see London Oratory).

Notable weddings and ceremonies

Catholic aristocrats who married at the church include John Crichton-Stuart, 3rd Marquess of Bute, and Gwendoline Fitzalan-Howard (1872), Lord William Beauchamp Nevill and Mabel Murietta (1889), Bernard Fitzalan-Howard, 16th Duke of Norfolk, and Lavinia Strutt (1937), Simon Fraser, 15th Lord Lovat, and Rosamund Broughton (1938), Peter Kerr, 12th Marquess of Lothian, and Antonella Newland (1943), Anthony Noel, 5th Earl of Gainsborough, and Mary Stourton (1947) and Julian Asquith, 2nd Earl of Oxford and Asquith, and Anne Palairet (1947). Others who married at the church include Lord of Appeal in Ordinary Baron Russell of Killowen, traveller and landowner John Talbot Clifton and author Violet Clifton (1907) and Australian rules footballer Joe Fogarty (24 December 1916).

Modern day
After World War II, with the resettlement of thousands of Polish Allied servicemen (many of them Roman Catholics) coming to Britain, South Kensington became a temporary Polish hub. Nearby were the offices of the Polish government-in-exile, the Polish Hearth Club and Polish Institute and Sikorski Museum among other meeting places for exiles. Due to the generosity of the Oratory Fathers, a Polish Solemn Mass was held every Sunday at 1 pm from 1945 until 1962 while the Polish community migrated westwards in the capital and the Polish Catholic Mission was able to establish in 1962 a parish at St Andrew Bobola Church, Hammersmith.

During the Cold War, the area between the pillars and the wall at the front of the Brompton Oratory was used as a dead drop by Soviet spies in Britain, from where they hoped to communicate with Moscow.

In September 2010 decorative banners were erected at the Brompton Oratory to celebrate the beatification of Cardinal Newman during the Pope's visit to London.

Architecture

A design from Herbert Gribble, then 29, won a competition in March 1869. The foundation stone was laid in June 1869; and the new church was consecrated on 16 April 1884. It was the largest Catholic church in London before the opening of Westminster Cathedral in 1903.

The competition specified the "Italian Renaissance" style, but the Roman Baroque and Wren are also drawn on. Devon marble is used in the major order of pilasters and the minor order of columns, with more exotic marbles in the apse and the altars, with carvings in metalwork, plasterwork, wood and stone. It houses Italian Baroque sculpture: The Twelve Apostles by Giuseppe Mazzuoli (1644-1725) acquired from Siena Cathedral in 1895 and the Lady Altar, with sculptures by Tommaso Rues (1650–1690 ca.). The architectonical structure of the altar, originally decorating a chapel dedicated to the Rosary, was acquired from the church of San Domenico Brescia after its demolition in 1883. Gribble's decorative scheme for the apse was not proceeded with, but the decoration of the St Wilfrid and the St Mary Magdalene chapels do reflect his intentions. The St Philip Neri altar is to his design. The second great decorative campaign (1927–32) was by the Italian architect C. T. G. Formilli, in mosaic, plaster and woodwork, the cost exceeding his estimate of £31,000. Further decoration marked the 1984 centenary. The reredos of Doric columns in yellow scagliola (2006) of the St Joseph chapel and a new altar and reredos of the Blessed Cardinal Newman (2010)  are by Russell Taylor. The statue of Newman in cardinal's robes (1896) is by L. J. Chavalliaud in architectural setting by Thomas Gaming. The church boasts magnificent vestments and altar plate, and houses an important library.

Parish
The Church of the Immaculate Heart of Mary (The Oratory) is the parish church, part of the Roman Catholic metropolitan diocese of Westminster, at whose request the Oratory parish is run by the Fathers of the Oratory. It is part of the Kensington and Chelsea Deanery.

Events
The church has strong ties with the nearby London Oratory School, which has Mass at the church for certain Holy Days of Obligation and feastdays. The school's annual patronal festival in honour of St. Philip Neri, is celebrated at the Oratory.

In front of the statue of St Peter, under the choir loft (a reproduction of that in St Peter's) that the medieval dedication of England to St Peter and Our Lady was repeated by Cardinal Vaughan, as a defiant riposte to the Erastianism of English official religion. The congregation is one of the largest Catholic congregations in London.

Liturgy
It is part of the tradition of the oratory in England to ensure that the liturgy is celebrated in a dignified and worthy manner. Mass is celebrated every day in Latin in the later and the 1962 (Tridentine) forms of the Roman Rite.

Choirs
The London Oratory is internationally known as one of the custodians of classic Catholic liturgical traditions. Solemn Latin Mass and Vespers are celebrated on all Sundays and obligatory holy days in the year. In particular, the great liturgies of Christmas, Holy Week and Easter attract packed congregations.

To serve the liturgy, the Oratory Fathers have fostered a notable musical establishment comprising three separate choirs plus a professional music staff.

Senior choir
The London Oratory Choir is an adult, professional chamber choir serving the major liturgical celebrations in the Oratory Church, including solemn Latin Mass and Vespers on all the Sundays of the year and for major feasts. Dating from the establishment of the London Oratory on its present Brompton Road site in 1854, the London Oratory Choir is England’s senior professional Catholic choir, and has an international reputation as one of the world’s leading exponents of choral music within the traditional Roman Rite, noted especially for its performances of Renaissance polyphony and the Masses of the Classical Viennese school. Recent Directors of Music have included Henry Washington (1935–1971), John Hoban (1971–1995), Andrew Carwood (1995–1999) and Patrick Russill (1999–present).

Junior choir
The London Oratory Junior Choir was founded in 1973 by John Hoban to give boys and girls together an opportunity to serve the liturgy in a great church. In addition to singing regularly one evening service and one Sunday (English) Mass every week, the Oratory Junior Choir is also active outside the Oratory. Noted for its free tone and forthright delivery, it has appeared in all London’s major concert halls and at the Proms, with conductors including Andrew Parrott, Nicholas Kraemer and Sir John Eliot Gardiner (including prize-winning recordings of Monteverdi’s Vespers in St Mark's Basilica in Venice, and Bach’s St Matthew Passion). Since 1979 it has provided the children’s chorus for Royal Ballet productions at the Royal Opera House, Covent Garden. It can also be heard on the soundtrack to Harry Potter and the Deathly Hallows – Part 1 and Harry Potter and the Deathly Hallows – Part 2. From 1984 its Director was Patrick Russill, and since 2005 its Director has been Charles Cole.

Schola
The London Oratory School Schola choir was founded in 1996. Educated in the Junior House of the London Oratory School in Fulham (London), boys from the age of 7 are given choral and instrumental training within a musical environment underpinned by Catholic traditions. The Schola is regarded as one of London's leading boys' choirs and sings at the Saturday 6.00pm Mass in term time, at daily prayer services and at benediction in the School chapel. The Director of the Schola is Charles Cole. In addition to liturgical and concert performances, the choir has recorded The Lord of the Rings (film series) soundtracks.  Its audio albums have mainly been joint albums with minor collaboration in performing Leonard Bernstein reflective, spiritual works or with soloist Roxanna Panufnik.

Organ
The London Oratory has a rich organ tradition since that of the Downes organ; its organists have been: Ralph Downes (1936–1977), Patrick Russill (1977–99), John McGreal (1999–2011), Matthew Martin (2011-2017) and Ben Bloor (2017 - current). The organ of 45 stops, 3 manuals and pedals, built by J. W. Walker & Sons Ltd, 1952–54, to the specification of Ralph Downes, was the first church organ in London to be built on neo-classical lines, and is considered one of the finest British organs built since World War II.

References

External links

Junior Choir website
London Oratory School Schola website

Churches completed in 1884
19th-century Roman Catholic church buildings in the United Kingdom
Grade II* listed churches in London
Brompton Oratory
Grade II* listed buildings in the Royal Borough of Kensington and Chelsea
Grade II* listed Roman Catholic churches in England
Roman Catholic churches in the Royal Borough of Kensington and Chelsea
Church buildings with domes
Knightsbridge
Churches in the Roman Catholic Diocese of Westminster